Black Lotus is the fifth and final studio album by Swedish heavy metal band Sister Sin.

Produced by Rikard Lofgren and Gustav Ydenius, the album was released by Victory Records on October 27, 2014. The same day, the album in full was streamed on Blabbermouth, and the official music video for "Chaos Royale" premiered on Loudwire. Before the album's release, a lyric video for the song was available on Metal Hammer.

Track listing

Personnel 
Sister Sin
Liv Jagrell - Vocals 
Jimmy Hiltula - Guitar
Strandh - Bass
Dave Sundberg - Drums
Additional personnel
 Another Victory - Publishing
Alan Douches - Mastering
 Cameron Webb - Mixing
Eddie Meduza - Voice sample track 9
David Sundberg - Additional Percussion
 Gustav Ydenius - Drum Tech & String Arrangements

References 

2014 albums
Sister Sin albums
Victory Records albums